KWUT (97.7 FM) is a radio station broadcasting a country music format. Licensed to Elsinore, Utah, United States, the station is currently owned by Douglas Barton, through licensee Sanpete County Broadcasting Company.

History
According to the FCC call sign history, the station signed on with the call letters KRFD on November 9, 1999. On September 11, 1998, the station changed its call letters to KSGI, and then back to KRFD on November 1, 1999. On November 25, 2000, the station became KACE, and KMGR by December 31, 2000. On November 15, 2001 it switched to KACE and then back to KRFD on May 29, 2001. The station became KLGL on June 16, 2001. On August 8, 2005, the station flipped to KCYQ. The calls finally flipped again in the fall of 2010, to the current call letters.

References

External links

WUT
Radio stations established in 2001
2001 establishments in Utah